Volkov may refer to:

Volkov (surname), people with the surname Volkov
Volkov (crater), a crater on the Moon
Volkov Commander, a file manager

See also
 Volkoff